Khyber is a historical Arabic drama television show directed by Mohammed Azizia and written by Yosri El-Gendy. The show stars Ayman Zeidan, Ahmed Maher and Sameh Al-Saraiti.

Synopsis
The series focuses on the social, economic, and religious life of Arab and Jewish people during the time of Muhammad. It details a perceived notion of the Jewish community's characteristics and their perceived hostility towards other groups. The series concentrates on the battle along Islamic and Jewish business interests in and around the Arabian Peninsula and against an alliance of Polytheists and the Muslim Front Business Interests, which ended with a victory by the Muslim business interests.

The show sheds light on the results of the conflict between Jewish and Muslim business interests. It portrays the consequences of the Battle and Fall of Khaybar, which destroyed Jewish economic and political power. This conflict concludes during an important episode in Islamic/Jewish history, with the rise of the Islamic Call. It called Muslim businesses to devote themselves to control of the people of Shirk and to embark on an Islamic conquest.

Cast

 Ayman Zidane: Abdullah bin Ubayy bin Saloul
 Mohammed al-Qabbani: Nuaim bin Masud
 Amer Ali: Mikdad bin Amr
 Sameh Al-Saraiti: Mohammad bin Maslama
 Mehyar Khaddour: Yousef
 Wissam Al-Breihi: Abdullah Bin Abdullah Bin Ubayy Bin Saloul
 Ruba Yassin: Zainab bint al-Harith
 Abdul Hakim Qutifan: Saad bin Muaz
 Abdul Kader Mulla: Ka'b ibn Assad
 Jawad al-Shukriji: Abu Sufyan
 Zeina Mansour: Hind Bint Utbah
 Hisham El Meligy: Rabie Bin Abi Al Hukaik
 Pierre Dagher: Huay Ibn Akhtab
 Ahmed Halawa: Salam bin Abi al-Huqaiq

Writer Yusri al-Jundi confirmed his experience with the historical series Khaybar, saying that it was difficult to finish the script. Al-Jundi says it took about two years between research and writing to create a show worthy of the Khyber invasion. "The charge of anti-Semitism is an old one and it is a lie and a pressure card used by the Zionists against anyone who tries to expose them and expose their conspiracies. But I think it is time to expose them even in America itself. I believe that the United States will realize that it has paid, and because of them lost many allies in the region, and they accused me of anti-Semitism when I made the play Jew Wandering so I do not care about these charges."

See also

 List of Islamic films
 Muhammad in film

References

Qatari historical television series
Arabic-language television shows
Films about Muhammad
2013 television films
2013 television series debuts
2013 television series endings
2013 television specials
Television series about Islam